HMS Kingston was a K-class destroyer of the Royal Navy.

The early years
Kingston was laid down by J. Samuel White and Company at Cowes on the Isle of Wight on 6 October 1937 as part of an order for six similar destroyers. She was launched at East Cowes on 9 January 1939 and named by the Mayoress of Kingston upon Thames. Commissioned on 14 September 1939 with the pennant number F64, she joined the 5th Destroyer Flotilla, Home Fleet, for convoy defence and anti-submarine duties in the North Sea.

All the crew of the U-boat were rescued and taken prisoner.

Red Sea operations
In May 1940 she was transferred to the Red Sea. Her pennant number for visual signalling purposes was changed to G64. On 17 March 1941 she supported landings at Berbera, British Somaliland. On 5 April Kingston found the s  and  aground south of Jeddah whose hulls, having been scuttled by the Italians, were destroyed by gunfire and air attack.

Force C and the battles of Sirte
In April 1941 Kingston was deployed to Alexandria to join the Eastern Mediterranean Fleet. There, she was involved in the evacuation of Allied troops from mainland Greece to Crete. On 20 May she deployed as part of Force C to the Battle of Crete.

On the night of 21 May 1941 Force C intercepted a convoy of 20 troop carrying caiques escorted by the  heading for Crete. Ten of the caiques were sunk and the landing prevented, but Lupo successfully covered the withdrawal of the remainder of the convoy. Cruiser  was damaged in the action.

One detached caique was sunk and, although the British did not press the attack on the main convoy, the Germans were forced to abort their attempt to reach Crete. Nonetheless, Sagittario covered the convoy's retreat by lying a smoke screen and firing her guns and torpedoes at the British squadron. According to British sources, Kingston suffered no damage from the naval engagement but splinter damage was reported from German air attacks. Force C was the target of fierce airstrikes which continued when they joined up with Force A1 at the Kithera channel. On 23 May Kingston and Kandahar returned and rescued 523 survivors.

She returned to Alexandria on 24 May 1941, and was taken in hand for repairs and modifications, among which was the replacement of the aft set of torpedo tubes with a four-inch anti-aircraft gun in recognition of the devastating effect of the air attacks suffered by Force C.

Kingston was engaged in defensive convoy duties to Tobruk and often as part of the escort for Breconshire on runs to Malta. She was also in action against Axis convoys and against the Vichy French in Syria.

  
On 17 December 1941 she took part in a brief engagement with the Italian Fleet, known as the First Battle of Sirte.

Fifteen men of her crew were killed in this incident, which left the destroyer temporarily dead in the water, the whaleboat torn to pieces, her anti-aircraft guns, searchlight tower and torpedo launchers smashed by the explosion, her starboard boiler and port engine out of action. According to some authors, like James Sadkovich and Vincent O'Hara, she was instead struck by an 8-inch round from the heavy cruiser . Maurizio Brescia instead credits the heavy cruiser  with the hit. With an engine in flames and a flooded boiler, she managed to recover her speed with the remaining engine, reaching Malta the next day.

Air raids and loss
On 4 April 1942, whilst the destroyer was in dock at Malta repairing the damage from the naval encounter, a bomb fell directly at the entrance of the Corradino tunnel, where part of her crew had taken shelter. Fourteen crewmen were killed by the blast including Commander Philip Somerville DSO., Lieutenant P. Hague, and Yeoman of Signals John Murphy, who was at their side, whilst directing the men into the safety of the Corradino tunnel.  All 14 crewmen are buried at either the Mtarfa Military Cemetery or the Capuccini Naval Cemetery. Approximately 35 dock workers were also wounded.

Kingston was attacked by German aircraft on 5 April and was further damaged by a near miss. On 8 April she was hit by a bomb, forward. This penetrated the decks and passed out of the ships bottom without exploding. But now the destroyer needed to go into dry dock for underwater repairs. On 9 April she was placed in No. 4 dock, but remained afloat. By 11 April she was still afloat in the dock. – perhaps plates bent outwards by the passage of the bomb through the bottom made it impossible to dock-down and these plates were being burnt away by divers. At about 17.30 on 11 April 1942 she was hit on the port side amidships in the area of the bulkhead between the engine-room and the gearing-room by Junkers Ju 87 aircraft from Sturzkampfgeschwader 3. She rolled over on her port side and sank in the dock. The ship was declared a constructive total loss. On 21 January 1943 the No. 4 dock was dried-out. The damaged midships part of the destroyer was scrapped, thus separating the destroyer in two sections. Dummy bulkheads were fitted to make the two sections float-able while an amount of the superstructure was burnt away. The two sections of Kingston were floated out of the dock on 5 April 1943 and in June were scuttled as a blockship between the Selmun headland and Selmunett Island (St Paul's Island) in northern Malta in the preparations for making a safe anchorage before the invasion of Sicily. In the early 1950s the two sections of the Kingston were scrapped, where sunk, by Italian shipbreakers.

Notes

Citations

References

Research Material 
 Imperial War Museum archives collection "George Sear"
 Imperial War Museum archives collection "John Murphy"

External links
 uboat.net webpage about HMS Kingston
 Memories of a seaman from HMS Kingston
 Photos of HMS Kingston in No. 4 dock
 History of HMS Kingston

 

J, K and N-class destroyers of the Royal Navy
Ships built on the Isle of Wight
1939 ships
World War II destroyers of the United Kingdom
Destroyers sunk by aircraft
Maritime incidents in March 1942
Maritime incidents in April 1942
Maritime incidents in June 1943
Ships sunk by German aircraft